Jonesville is an unincorporated community in Pike County, Alabama, United States. Jonesville is located on the former Mobile and Girard Railroad, between Troy and Linwood.

References

Unincorporated communities in Pike County, Alabama
Unincorporated communities in Alabama